Slim lightfish, also known as Ichthyococcus elongatus, is a species of the genus Ichthyococcus.

References

Ichthyococcus
Fish described in 1941